Ponevezh Yeshiva, often pronounced as Ponevitch Yeshiva, is a yeshiva founded in 1908 in Ponevezh, Lithuania, and located today in Bnei Brak, Israel since 1944.  The yeshiva has over three thousand students, including those of affiliated institutions, and is considered one of the leading Litvish yeshivas in Israel.

History
Founded in 1908, the yeshiva was originally located in city of Panevėžys (Ponevezh), Lithuania before the Holocaust. After the death of its founder, Yitzhak Yaakov Rabinovich, the yeshiva was re-established in Bnei Brak in 1944 by Yosef Shlomo Kahaneman, who appointed Shmuel Rozovsky as dean, and some years later appointed Dovid Povarsky as rosh yeshiva.

The main study hall has an original 16th-century Italian wooden aron kodesh (Torah scroll ark), brought to the yeshiva in the early 1980s, and restored and re-gilded with 22 carat gild leaf.

Split into two factions 
During the 1990s, leadership of the yeshiva was the subject of a public disagreement between two of its leaders. Since then, the yeshiva has split and resulted in two yeshivas in the same building, with the students occupying different dormitories, though studying in the same learning hall and eating in the same dining room.

The Kahaneman faction of the yeshiva is led by rabbis Gershon Eidelstein and Berel Povarsky (son of Dovid Povarsky) and Chaim Peretz Berman (a grandson of The Steipler, and a son-in-law of Kahanaman). The Markovitz faction of the yeshiva is led by rabbis Shmuel Markovitz, Asher Deutch, and Eliyahu Eliezer Dessler.

Notable teachers
Rabbis who have taught at the yeshiva include:
 Yosef Shlomo Kahaneman, founder and rosh yeshiva in Lithuania and Israel
 Eliyahu Eliezer Dessler (1892–1953), mashgiach ruchani, author of the Michtav me-Eliyahu
 Yechezkel Levenstein (1895–1974), mashgiach ruchani, author of Or Yechezkel
 Shmuel Rozovsky, rosh yeshiva
 Dovid Povarsky, rosh yeshiva
 Elazar Menachem Man Shach, rosh yeshiva
 Chaim Friedlander, mashgiach, co-compiler of Michtav me-Eliyahu and author of the well known Sifsei Chaim series (not to be confused with the Liska Rebbe of   the same name)
 Baruch Dov Povarsky, commonly called R' Berel, rosh yeshiva
 Gershon Edelstein, rosh yeshiva and spiritual leader of the Degel HaTorah political party in Israel

Notable alumni

Alumni include the following rabbis:
 Pinchas Goldschmidt

 Shraga Feivish Hager, Kosover rebbe

 Dr. Mordechai Halperin, Chief Officer of Medical Ethics for the Israeli Ministry of Health, director of the Dr. Falk Schlesinger Institute

 Meir Kessler

 Dov Landau

 Israel Meir Lau, former Ashkenazi Chief Rabbi of Israel

 Yaakov Peretz, rosh yeshiva of Midrash Sepharadi

 Yoel Schwartz, Torah scholar and author, senior lecturer at Yeshiva Dvar Yerushalayim

 Avrohom Yitzchok Ulman, rabbi of Ner Yisroel in Jerusalem, member of Jerusalem's Edah HaChareidis

Affiliated institutions 
Kollel Avreichim — located on the grounds of the yeshiva in the Ohel Kedoshim building; intended for married students who have graduated from the yeshiva.
Yeshivat Ponevezh Le'zeirim — a division for 200 high school students headed by Rabbi Michel Yehuda Lefkowitz, and was formerly co-headed by Rabbi Aharon Yehuda Leib Shteinman.
Batei Avot — sheltered accommodation established by Rabbi Yosef Shlomo Kahaneman for children rescued from the holocaust, orphans and children from broken homes donated by Henry Krausher.
Grodno Yeshiva - Beer Yaakov — an additional yeshiva located in Beer Yaakov.
Grodno Yeshiva - Ashdod, also known as Ponevezh Ashdod — an additional yeshiva located in Ashdod.

References

External links
 Official website
 The Jewish Panevezhys
 During the Period of Independent Lithuania

 
Buildings and structures in Tel Aviv District
Yeshivas of Lithuania
Orthodox yeshivas in Bnei Brak
Jewish seminaries
Lithuanian-Jewish culture in Israel
Pre-World War II European yeshivas